Robert Weinstock (born April 8, 1967, in Philadelphia) is an American children's book author and illustrator. Some of his books were  published under the pseudonym of Rowboat Watkins.

Awards
In 2010 he received the Sendak fellowship.
His book Rude Cakes won an Ezra Jack Keats Honor in 2016. Pete With No Pants was reviewed by Kate Quealy-Gainer who writes that it is a lovely, absurd little tale with humor both "jubilant and sardonic" and "it's bound to be a familiar situation to many a carefree, nudist kid and their exasperated, clothes-demanding parent".

Accident 
On October 7, 2003, Weinstock was hit by a truck resulting in serious injuries and loss of much of his ability to taste. An article in The New York Times detailed his experiences.

Published works 

 Gordimer Byrd's Reminder (2004)
 Giant Meatball (2008)
 Food Hates You, Too and Other Poems (2009)
 Can You Dig It? (2010)
 Rude Cakes (2015)  (as "Rowboat Watkins")
translation: Le petit gâteau qui ne disait pas merci (2015)  (as "Rowboat Watkins")
Pete With No Pants (2017). (as "Rowboat Watkins")
translation: Bu chuan ku zi de pi te (2018)  (as "Rowboat Watkins")
 Big Bunny (2018) (as "Rowboat Watkins")
 Most Marshmallows (2019)  (as "Rowboat Watkins")
 Mabel : a Mermaid Fable (2020)  (as "Rowboat Watkins")

Illustrated works 

 I'm Not (2010)
Tiny Cedric by Sally Llloyd Jones  (as "Rowboat Watkins")

References 

1967 births
American children's writers
American children's book illustrators
Living people